The following article presents a summary of the 2005 football (soccer) season in Brazil, which was the 104th season of competitive football in the country.

Campeonato Brasileiro Série A

Corinthians declared as the Campeonato Brasileiro champions.

Relegation
The four worst placed teams, which are Coritiba, Atlético Mineiro, Paysandu and Brasiliense, were relegated to the following year's second level.

Campeonato Brasileiro Série B

Grêmio declared as the Campeonato Brasileiro Série B champions.

Promotion
The two best placed teams in the final stage of the competition, which are Grêmio and Santa Cruz, were promoted to the following year's first level.

Relegation
The six worst placed teams, which are Vitória, Bahia, Anapolina, União Barbarense, Criciúma and Caxias, were relegated to the following year's third level.

Campeonato Brasileiro Série C

Remo declared as the Campeonato Brasileiro Série C champions.

Promotion
The two best placed teams in the final stage of the competition, which are Remo and América-RN, were promoted to the following year's second level.

Copa do Brasil

The Copa do Brasil final was played between Paulista and Fluminense.

Paulista declared as the cup champions by aggregate score of 2-0.

State championship champions

Youth competition champions

Other competition champions

Brazilian clubs in international competitions

Brazil national team
The following table lists all the games played by the Brazil national football team in official competitions and friendly matches during 2005.

Women's football

Brazil women's national football team
The following table lists all the games played by the Brazil women's national football team in official competitions and friendly matches during 2005.

Domestic competition champions

References

 Brazilian competitions at RSSSF
 2005 Brazil national team matches at RSSSF
 2004-2007 Brazil women's national team matches at RSSSF

 
Seasons in Brazilian football
Brazil